Welgevonden Game Reserve, (Dutch for well found), is in the Waterberg District, of the Limpopo, province of South Africa. Welgevonden Game Reserve, (Dutch for "well found"), is a 38,200ha game reserve in the Waterberg District, of the Limpopo Province of South Africa.
 
 
The reserve comprises mountainous terrain that is dissected by deep valleys and kloofs while flat plateaus characterise most hilltops. Altitude varies from 1080 m in the north to ±1800 m in the southern section of the reserve.
 
Welgevonden is home to over 50 different mammals, including the Big Five.
The diversity of habitat leads to a wide range of wildlife with grassy plains abounding with antelope from the largest eland to the diminutive duiker; and cheetah, lion and leopard are regularly seen close by. There are also numerous rare and unusual species such as brown hyena, aardwolf, pangolin and aardvark – all best seen at night. Over 300 bird species can be seen on the reserve, including rare blue cranes which breed in the southern section early in the year.

Wildlife 
Including: lion, elephant, white rhino, buffalo, sable, gemsbok, leopard, antelope, giraffe, warthog, bush pig, aardvark, and pangolin. It has one of the largest populations of white rhino on any private reserve in Africa.

References

External links 
Welgevonden Game Reserve Website
Welgevonden Game Reserve Lodges Website

See also 
 Protected areas of South Africa

Nature reserves in South Africa